Salamat Azimi (born 1965) is an Afghan politician who served as Counter Narcotics Minister.

Early life and education
Azimi was born in Andkhoy District of Faryab Province in 1965. She is an ethnic Uzbek. She attended Abu-Muslim Khurasani High School and received a BA in law and political science from Kabul University. She received a master's degree from Payame Noor University in 2014.

Career
Azimi was professor in law and political science and head of the criminal law department at Balkh University. She was a member of the national peace consultative jirga of Balkh in 2011 and a member of the traditional Loya jirga from Balkh Province in 2012. From 2011 to 2015, she was in charge of children's rights protection for northern Afghanistan, working at the Afghan Independent Human Rights Commission in Mazar-i-Sharif. She also worked as a director for the Aryana Legal Organization.

Azimi was appointed as Minister of Counter Narcotics by President Ashraf Ghani on 21 April 2015. She is viewed by the United States as a "Dostum" appointee. The role has been described as the world's toughest job. In July 2015, Azimi said that 3.5 million people in Afghanistan were addicts, and in 2016, opium cultivation increased by 10%.

In November 2016, the Wolesi Jirga dismissed seven cabinet members over four days during impeachment hearings. Azimi obtained a vote of confidence, with 71 votes.

United Nations Office on Drugs and Crime (UNODC) has been working with the Ministry for counter Narcotics of Afghanistan. Together they organized a two-day conference on "Promoting Afghanistan's Alternative Development Initiatives among Regional and International Partners" in Ashgabat, Turkmenistan. Professor Salamat Azimi, Afghanistan's Minister for Counter Narcotics informed the conference about her government's policies to upkeep this goal. Other countries participating in the conference were Pakistan, Tajikistan, Uzbekistan, Kazakhstan, Iran, Turkmenistan, Thailand and Colombia. United States, Russia, Japan and the European Union also supported the conference.

Personal life
Azimi is married and has five children.

References

External links
 Ministry Profile 

Living people
1965 births
Afghan Tajik people
Government ministers of Afghanistan
Afghan human rights activists
Women lawyers
Afghan lawyers
Kabul University alumni
Women government ministers of Afghanistan
21st-century Afghan women politicians
21st-century Afghan politicians
Payame Noor University alumni